The 1952 United States Senate election in Maine was held on September 8, 1952. 

Incumbent Republican Senator Owen Brewster ran for re-election to a third term, but lost the Republican primary to Governor of Maine Frederick Payne. Payne easily won the general election against two Democratic opponents, party nominee Roger Dube and independent Democrat Earl Grant.

Republican primary

Candidates
 Owen Brewster, incumbent Senator since 1941
 Frederick G. Payne, Governor of Maine

Campaign
Payne's campaign was encouraged and partly funded by billionaire Howard Hughes, who sought to end Brewster's political career over the investigation of Hughes's Trans World Airlines for war profiteering. 

Payne's victory may also have been aided by Brewster's connections to McCarthyism and racist groups like the Ku Klux Klan.

Results

Democratic primary

Candidates
 Roger P. Dube
 Earl S. Grant

Results

General election

Results

See also 
 1952 United States Senate elections

References 

1952
Maine
United States Senate